Daniel Leon Cadamarteri (born 12 October 1979) is an English retired professional footballer who played in the Football League for clubs including Everton, Bradford City, Huddersfield Town, Leicester City and latterly Carlisle United before retiring in April 2014. He also played non-league football for Grays Athletic and in the Scottish League for Dundee United.

Early in his career, he played three times for the England national under-21 football team.

Club career

Early career
Cadamarteri was born in Cleckheaton, West Yorkshire, to an English mother of Italian descent and a Jamaican father. Cadamarteri was a product of the Everton Academy and made his debut as a substitute at the end of the 1996–97 season, in a 2–1 defeat against Chelsea. Cadamarteri began the next season as a regular and scored four league goals in the first three months of the season, including one in the Merseyside derby against Liverpool. That goal – in October – was his last in the 1997–98 season, although he featured regularly throughout the campaign. Cadamarteri featured prominently during the following season, again netting four goals. He went on loan to Fulham in November 1999, scoring on his debut against Stockport County.

In June 2001, Cadamarteri appeared in court on a charge of assault, admitting in September he was "ashamed" about the incident. He was found guilty and fined £2,000, with Everton subsequently announcing he was free to leave Goodison Park. Despite interest from First Division clubs Stoke City and Bradford City, Cadamarteri remained at Everton and featured as a late substitute in November, starting a further two matches in January.

Bradford City
In February 2002, Cadamarteri left Everton to join Bradford City on loan, making the move permanent after scoring on his debut. Featuring in most of the remaining games that season, Cadamarteri only scored one more goal, netting in late April. After receiving community service in July for admitting conspiracy to pervert the course of justice in his previous court case, Cadamarteri failed to score a league goal during the 2002–03 season, with a contract dispute adding to a frustrating season.

Later career
After scoring three league goals during the following season, Cadamarteri began the 2004–05 season with Leeds United, agreeing a move in June 2004. Appearing in only a League Cup match, the winger moved to Sheffield United in September, scoring once against Crewe Alexandra before injury ended his season in March. At the end of the season, Cadamarteri made a return to Bradford, where – despite featuring regularly – he scored just two league goals.

After incurring a six-month drugs ban and subsequently being released in the summer, Cadamarteri had a trial with Barnsley before signing for Conference National side Grays Athletic in December on non-contract terms. At the end of December, Cadamarteri signed a six-month deal with Leicester City, scoring once against Fulham in the FA Cup before joining Doncaster Rovers on loan, scoring once against Brighton & Hove Albion. He was released by Leicester in May 2007 after his contract was not renewed.

Huddersfield Town
He signed for Huddersfield Town on 1 June 2007. Most of Cadamarteri's Town career was hampered by injury, with the forward making no more than a dozen league appearances in his first season at the West Yorkshire side scoring three goals over the course of the season. The 2008–09 season saw Cadamarteri feature regularly, playing over thirty league matches throughout the season, though most of his games during the 2008–09 season came when playing on the wing as opposed to his more regular position as a forward, finishing the season with two goals to his name, both coming in the league. During April 2009, it was revealed that Cadamarteri had rejected a new contract at Huddersfield, due to the terms in the contract, which only gave him the option of a second year, dependent on appearances.

Dundee United
In May, he agreed a pre-contract deal with Scottish Premier League side Dundee United, reuniting him with Craig Levein, who managed him at Leicester. Cadamarteri scored twice on his competitive debut in the 2–0 win against Heart of Midlothian on 17 August 2009 and scored again in the following home match, winning the August Player of the Month award. He was an unused substitute as Dundee United won the 2010 Scottish Cup Final. On 27 January 2011, Cadamarteri was released by mutual consent at Dundee United. He had played 14 games in his second season, but all but two of those were as substitute.

Return to Huddersfield
On 31 January 2011, Cadamarteri returned to Huddersfield Town on a short-term contract. He made his debut in the 4–1 win against Exeter City at St James Park, where he scored two minutes after coming on as a substitute. Although Town missed out on promotion, he proved himself a valuable squad member as an impact substitute. He agreed a one-year contract on 5 July.

He left the club in June 2012, after not being offered a new contract by the manager, Simon Grayson.

Carlisle United
On 21 June 2012, Cadamarteri signed a two-year deal with Carlisle United. In 2014, he retired due to a knee injury.

International career
Cadamarteri was capped three times by the England under-21 team. He made his debut on 17 November 1998 in a friendly match as a substitute against Czech Republic at Portman Road. His second appearance was over a year later on 29 March 2000, again as a substitute, against Yugoslavia. His final appearance for the team was on 24 May 2001 against Mexico.

Coaching career
After his retirement, Cadamerteri worked briefly as a coach with Leeds Ladies F.C., before accepting a position as a coach in Sheffield Wednesday's academy, where he has achieved his UEFA A Licence and his FA Advanced youth award age specific (u17s-U23s)

In July 2017, Cadamerteri was appointed as U18s Professional Development Phase Coach at Burnley FC On 5 October 2018, Cadamerteri left his role to 'pursue other coaching opportunities'.

Personal life
His son Bailey is also a footballer for Sheffield Wednesday.

Career statistics

See also
List of doping cases in sport

References

External links
The return of Danny Cadamarteri

1979 births
Living people
People from Cleckheaton
English footballers
English people of Jamaican descent
English people of Italian descent
England under-21 international footballers
English sportspeople in doping cases
Association football forwards
Everton F.C. players
Fulham F.C. players
Bradford City A.F.C. players
Leeds United F.C. players
Sheffield United F.C. players
Grays Athletic F.C. players
Leicester City F.C. players
Doncaster Rovers F.C. players
Huddersfield Town A.F.C. players
Dundee United F.C. players
Carlisle United F.C. players
Premier League players
English Football League players
National League (English football) players
Scottish Premier League players
Black British sportsmen
Doping cases in association football
English people convicted of assault
Sportspeople convicted of crimes